Jonathon Marsh (born 17 October 1995) is a professional Australian rules footballer who plays for East Fremantle in the West Australian Football League (WAFL). He previously played for Collingwood from 2014 to 2016 and St Kilda from 2019 to 2020 in the Australian Football League (AFL).

Marsh played his junior football with the Augusta-Margaret River Hawks, often with older brother Harry, of the Sydney Swans, and he went to school in Margaret River and Busselton. He was recruited by the club with the 77th selection in the 2013 AFL draft. Marsh was a late pick, drafted for his attack on the ball and defensive attributes. He made his debut in round 19, 2015 against Carlton. In November 2016, he announced his retirement from AFL football to return to his home state of Western Australia. He returned to WA to play for East Fremantle again in 2021.

Statistics

|- style="background-color: #eaeaea"
! scope="row" style="text-align:center" | 2014
|  || 46 || 0 || — || — || — || — || — || — || — || — || — || — || — || — || — || —
|-
! scope="row" style="text-align:center" | 2015
|  || 17 || 5 || 0 || 0 || 26 || 25 || 51 || 10 || 9 || 0.0 || 0.0 || 5.2 || 5.0 || 10.2 || 2.0 || 1.8
|- 
! scope="row" style="text-align:center" | 2016
|  || 17 || 10 || 0 || 1 || 83 || 41 || 124 || 44 || 30 || 0.0 || 0.1 || 8.3 || 4.1 || 12.4 || 4.4 || 3.0
|- 
! scope="row" style="text-align:center" | 2019
|  || 43 || 5 || 1 || 1 || 29 || 12 || 41 || 15 || 11 || 0.2 || 0.2 || 5.8 || 2.4 || 8.2 || 3.0 || 2.2
|- class="sortbottom"
! colspan=3| Career
! 20
! 1
! 2
! 138
! 78
! 216
! 69
! 50
! 0.1
! 0.1
! 6.9
! 3.9
! 10.8
! 3.5
! 2.5
|}

References

External links

1995 births
Living people
Collingwood Football Club players
Australian rules footballers from Western Australia
East Fremantle Football Club players
St Kilda Football Club players
Sandringham Football Club players
People from Margaret River, Western Australia